Alba are a Danish medieval music ensemble founded in 1992. The ensemble consists of the duo Agnethe Christensen (voice, kantele) and Poul Høxbro (recorder, percussion), or the trio with the harpist Helen Davis.

Discography
The ensemble released four recordings on the Danish Classico label. The first three of these, together with a solo recording by Høxbro, were then re-released as a 4-for-1 box by Membran. 
 Hildegard von Bingen. Music from Symphonia harmonia caelestium revelationum. O viriditas.. Agnethe Christensen, Poul Høxbro, Helen Davies with members of the vocal ensemble Con Fuoco CLASSCD 198:
 Songs of longing and lustful tunes. Cantigas de amigo. CLASSCD 225: Agnethe Christensen, Poul Høxbro
 Die tenschen Morder CLASSCD 335:  Meister Rumelant, minnesinger at the Danehof court. Poul Høxbro, Agnethe Christensen, Miriam Andersén
 It barn er fød CLASSCD 395: Old Yuletide Songs from Scandinavia. Et barn er fodt i Bethlehem. Laus Virginis nati sonat. Personent hodie... Miriam Andersen, Poul Høxbro, Agnethe Christensen
Solo:
 Tu-tu pan-pan. CLASSCD 286: A piper's journey through medieval Europe. Got in vier elementen. Poul Høxbro

References

Early music groups